Antonio María Rouco Varela (born 20 August 1936) is a Spanish prelate of the Roman Catholic Church and a prominent member of its conservative wing. He served as Archbishop of Madrid from 1994 to 2014. He was made a cardinal in 1998. Cardinal Rouco Varela was president of the Episcopal Conference of Spain from 1999 to 2005 and again from 2008 to 2014.

Biography
Antonio Rouco Varela was born in Vilalba to Vicente Rouco and María Eugenia Varela, the latter of whom hailed from Bahía Blanca, Argentina. He has four siblings: Visitación, Jose, Manuel, and Eugenia. He studied at the seminary in Mondoñedo and at the Pontifical University of Salamanca (1954–1958), from where he obtained his licentiate in theology. Rouco was ordained to the priesthood by Bishop Francisco Barbado y Viejo, OP, on 28 March 1959.

He then furthered his studies at the University of Munich, earning a doctorate in canon law in 1964 with a dissertation on church-state relations in 16th century Spain. He held a series of academic posts, teaching fundamental theology, canon law, and ecclesiastical law at the seminary of Mondoñedo, and the University of Munich. In 1976 he was appointed titular Bishop of Gergi and Auxiliary bishop of the Archdiocese of Santiago de Compostela by Pope Paul VI. Named Archbishop of Santiago de Compostela in 1984 by Pope John Paul II, he played a key role in the hosting of the 4th World Youth Day in 1989. Five years later, in 1994, he was named Archbishop of Madrid by Pope John Paul II.

John Paul II created him Cardinal-Priest of S. Lorenzo in Damaso in the consistory of 21 February 1998. He was one of the cardinal electors who participated in the 2005 papal conclave that selected Pope Benedict XVI. In 2011, he was the incumbent Cardinal Archbishop of Madrid, when Pope Benedict XVI made a Papal Visit to the city for World Youth Day 2011. Also that year, the University of "San Dámaso" was founded in Madrid. Rouco Varela again was a cardinal elector in the papal conclave that elected Pope Francis in March 2013.

On 28 August 2014 he was replaced as Archbishop of Madrid by Carlos Osoro Sierra, who represents a more centrist fraction of the Spanish Catholic church. Having passed 80, he will not be an elector in the next papal election.

Views

Neocatechumenal Way
Cardinal Rouco Varela is a known supporter of the Neocatechumenal Way. Along with its founder, Kiko Arguello, he has co-ordinated massive rallies on 31 December 2007 and 2008 known as 'family days' to promote the Catholic family model and to oppose same-sex marriage.

Abortion and marriage
He led the opposition to the Socialist Spanish government over abortion and same-sex marriage.

Church architecture
During his tenure as Cardinal Archbishop of Madrid, he had the Neo-Gothic Almudena Cathedral decorated with paintings by Neocatechumenal artist Kiko Argüello and mosaics by Father Marko Ivan Rupnik.

Youth
Cardinal Rouco Varela claims that he wishes to convince young people that Christ really loves them and wants them to be happy. He invites them "for a profound, authentic and joyful encounter with Jesus Christ, our Lord and Savior, who calls young people in his Church so that their lives, often depressed and broken, and others fresh and vigorous, will be rooted and built up in Him, the only one who can offer them and give them truth, hope and love; the only one who can show them the right direction and accompany them on the way that leads to genuine and lasting happiness" as he wrote in a letter just before the World Youth Day of 2011.

References

External links

 
 Biography at catholic-pages.com

1936 births
Living people
People from Vilalba
20th-century Spanish cardinals
Archbishops of Madrid
21st-century Spanish cardinals
Ludwig Maximilian University of Munich alumni
Members of the Apostolic Signatura
Cardinals created by Pope John Paul II
Pontifical University of Salamanca alumni